Rouge d'Ottrott is a Pinot Noir red wine produced in the commune of Ottrott, in the Bas-Rhin. It is a geographical denomination within the registered designation of origin Alsace AOC, which mainly produces white wines.
It is recommended drunk at 10°-16 °C.

References

See also
Alsace Grand Cru AOC 
Crémant d'Alsace AOC

French wine